Majrowski v Guy's and St Thomas' NHS Trust [2006] UKHL 34 is a UK labour law case holding that an employer will be vicariously liable for the harassment of an employee by another.

Facts
Mr William Majrowski was a gay man, and worked as a clinical auditor co-ordinator. He claimed that his manager, Sandra Freeman bullied and harassed him, in breach of section 1 of the Protection from Harassment Act 1997. He said this made the employer vicariously liable. The judge held there was no cause of action because section 3 created no statutory tort for which an employer could be vicariously liable.

Judgment
The House of Lords held that there was a new statutory tort for harassment in the Protection from Harassment Act 1997, and it made employers vicariously liable. It was not solely about stalking. This was supported by section 10(1) concerning Scotland. Lord Nicholls emphasised the overlap with European Directives’ common definition of harassment, meaning unwanted conduct violating the dignity of a person. He said the following.

Lord Hope, Lady Hale, Lord Carswell and Lord Brown gave concurring opinions.

See also

UK labour law
UK employment equality law
Workplace harassment

Notes

References

External links
Majrowski v Guy's and St Thomas' NHS Trust [2006] UKHL 34. Publications.parliament.uk

United Kingdom labour case law
House of Lords cases
2006 in case law
2006 in British law
Harassment